Rafer Mohammed (born October 4, 1955 on Trinidad) is a retired athlete from Trinidad and Tobago who specialized in the 400 metres and 4 x 400 metres relay.

Achievements

External links
Best of Trinidad

1955 births
Living people
Trinidad and Tobago male sprinters
Athletes (track and field) at the 1980 Summer Olympics
Olympic athletes of Trinidad and Tobago
Athletes (track and field) at the 1979 Pan American Games
Pan American Games competitors for Trinidad and Tobago